Hyphessobrycon arianae is a species of tetra in the family Characidae. It is native to the Paraná River basin. It can grow to a length of about 2.5 centimeters.

Named in honor of André Uj's colleague Ariane Devore.

References
http://www.fishbase.org/summary/57986

Characidae
Fish of South America
Tetras
Taxa named by Jacques Géry
Fish described in 1989